Criner is an unincorporated community  in McClain County, Oklahoma, United States. It is located on State Highway 59.

Criner is named after nearby Criner Creek, which in turn was named after the rancher George A. Criner.

References

Unincorporated communities in McClain County, Oklahoma
Unincorporated communities in Oklahoma